Arequipa is a major city in Peru. 

Arequipa may also refer to:

Places:
 Arequipa Region, Peru
 Arequipa Province
 Arequipa District
 Roman Catholic Archdiocese of Arequipa
 737 Arequipa, an asteroid

Other uses:
Arequipa turbatella, a species of moth in the monotypic genus Arequipa
Arequipa Pottery, California, an Arts and Crafts pottery
USS Arequipa (AF-31), a stores ship of the United States Navy
Boyden Observatory, which was located at Arequipa and often referred to as Arequipa